Béla Balogh (born 30 December 1984) is a Hungarian footballer who plays as a centre back for Budapesti VSC.

Balogh has represented MTK Hungária, BFC Siófok, Kecskeméti TE and Pécsi MFC in Hungary and has also played for Colchester United in England and Real Murcia in Spain. He has also represented Hungary nine times at full international level.

Career

Born in Budapest, Hungary, Balogh began his career with MTK Hungária in 2002, being loaned out to BFC Siófok for two seasons between 2002 and 2004. He made over 100 league appearances for MTK between 2002 and 2010.

In August 2007, Balogh signed on loan for English Championship club Colchester United with a view to a permanent move. He returned to MTK after his loan in May 2008 having made 17 appearances for the U's. He signed on loan with Spanish club Real Murcia for the 2008–09 season.

In 2010, Balogh signed for Kecskeméti TE. He spent three seasons with the club, making 64 appearances. In 2013, he joined Pécsi MFC.

International statistics

Between 2006 and 2007, Balogh made nine appearances for the Hungary national football team.

References

External links

1984 births
Living people
Footballers from Budapest
Hungarian footballers
Association football defenders
Hungary international footballers
MTK Budapest FC players
BFC Siófok players
Colchester United F.C. players
Real Murcia players
Kecskeméti TE players
Pécsi MFC players
Gyirmót FC Győr players
Mezőkövesdi SE footballers
Budapesti VSC footballers
Nemzeti Bajnokság I players
Nemzeti Bajnokság II players
English Football League players
Hungarian expatriate footballers
Expatriate footballers in England
Expatriate footballers in Spain
Hungarian expatriate sportspeople in England
Hungarian expatriate sportspeople in Spain
21st-century Hungarian people